Malene Degin (born 1996) is a Danish cross-country cyclist.

She participated at the 2018 UCI Mountain Bike World Championships, winning a medal.

References

1996 births
Living people
Danish female cyclists
21st-century Danish women